International Team (IT) was an Italian game company founded in the 1970s and active until the early 1980s. While the company started as a jigsaw puzzle producer, it is mostly remembered as a wargame company, a business that IT approached in 1979 after game designer Marco Donadoni joined in.

IT was the first Italian wargame company and its most successful games, such as Zargo's Lords, were instrumental in introducing the wargame culture in Italy. IT games were translated in other languages (mostly French, German and English) and exported abroad. At the peak of IT's popularity, foreign branches of the company were founded, such as International Team France (established in 1979). Besides wargames, IT also published a few roleplaying games (such as Legio VII and Magikon) and ordinary board games.

The company went bankrupt in 1988. Some of their assets were acquired by the French company Eurogames, that later published a few games based on designs and materials by IT, such as Colonizer based on IT's Kroll & Prumni and Zargos based on Zargo's Lords.

Published games

Historical importance 
While some of International Team's games were quite "typical" of their era and generally not on par with U.S. and British offerings (which benefitted from a more developed hobby and gaming culture) they saturated the Italian market (where in early 1980s fluent English readers were by no means common) and also enjoyed commercial success in France and Germany. Some of their best games were highly innovative, such as the non-strategic Napoleonic ones (Austerlitz, Jena, Waterloo), presenting a unique Octagons and Squares board, better suited to the Napoleonic infantry formations (square, line, column...). Some other, like 'Norge' and 'Supermarina' tackled topics and campaigns which seldom enjoyed dedicated boardgames.

References

External links

Board game publishing companies
Game manufacturers